Tutti per Bruno is an Italian television series. It is an adaptation of Los hombres de Paco. It premiered on Canale 5 in 2010.

See also
List of Italian television series

References

External links
 

Italian television series
2010 Italian television series debuts
Italian television series based on Spanish television series